Kaukab Quder Sajjad Ali Meerza (also Dr M Kaukab) was an Indian scholar of the Urdu language

A specialist in the literature of Awadh State during the reign of its last Nawab, Wajid Ali Shah (1822-1887), Meerza taught Urdu at Aligarh Muslim University, retiring in 1993.   The Indian filmmaker, Satyajit Ray consulted with Meerza over many months during the writing of the screenplay for his 1977 award-winning film Shatranj ke Khilari (The Chess Players), which was set in Awadh in the period immediately preceding the Indian rebellion of 1857.

Meerza was an enthusiast of snooker; he refereed many tournaments and was the founder-secretary of the Billiards and Snooker Federation of India.

The last pensioner in the Awadh Pension Book of 1897 established by the British Raj and honoured by the Government of India after 1947, and the only surviving great-grandson of Wajid Ali Shah, Meerza died of complications from Covid-19 at age 87 in Kolkata on September 14, 2020.

References

See also
Company rule in India

1930s births
2020 deaths
Awadh
Urdu in India
Snooker referees and officials
Indian referees and umpires
Indian scholars
Deaths from the COVID-19 pandemic in India
Academic staff of Aligarh Muslim University